Marcelo Antônio Guedes Filho (born 20 May 1987), commonly known as Marcelo, is a Brazilian professional footballer who plays as a centre-back for Australian club Western Sydney Wanderers.

Career

Santos
Born in São Vicente, Marcelo began his career at Santos, making his first team debut in the 2007 season. He won the Campeonato Paulista with the club that season. He also helped his team qualify to Copa Libertadores semifinals in the 2007 season as well as to quarterfinals in the following campaign. Marcelo made 65 appearances for Santos in all competitions before his contract expired at the end of August 2008.

Wisła Kraków
Marcelo subsequently signed a five-year contract with Polish Ekstraklasa champions Wisła Kraków on 1 September 2008. However, his former club Santos refused to issue his certificate stating that Marcelo has a contract with them until 2011. The court ultimately rejected these claims and Marcelo was successfully registered as a Wisła player.

Marcelo won the Ekstraklasa championship title in his debut season, contributing with 21 matches and three successful strikes. He formed a prominent partnership with Arkadiusz Głowacki in the centre of defence, both were among the three nominees for Ekstraklasa Defender of the Year award in 2009. In the 2009–10 season, Marcelo finished as the club's third top scorer with a seven goals in the league for the eventual Ekstraklasa runners up.

PSV
On 8 July 2010, Marcelo joined Eredivisie side PSV on a three-year deal for an undisclosed fee from Wisła Kraków. He immediately established himself as a regular in the team, playing in 45 matches in all competitions during his first season. In the following campaign, Marcelo won his first trophy with the Dutch outfit, beating Heracles Almelo in the KNVB Cup.

Hannover 96
On 10 August 2013, it was announced that PSV had sold Marcelo to Hannover 96 for an undisclosed transfer fee.

Beşiktaş
On 1 February 2016, Marcelo joined Turkish club Beşiktaş.

Lyon
On 13 July 2017, Marcelo joined Ligue 1 club Lyon. The transfer fee was an initial €7 million plus €0.5 million in bonuses.

In August 2021, Marcelo was demoted to Lyon's reserve team after inappropriate behaviour in the locker room following a 3–0 defeat to Angers, in which the player scored an own goal. On 26 January 2022, his contract at the club was terminated.

Bordeaux 
On 28 January 2022, Marcelo joined French side Bordeaux on a contract until the end of the season. Bordeaux went on to suffer relegation, and Marcelo left the club as a free agent at the end of his contract.

Western Sydney Wanderers 
On 31 July 2022, Marcelo signed a one-year contract with Western Sydney Wanderers in Australia.

Career statistics

Honours
Santos
Campeonato Paulista: 2007

Wisła Kraków
Ekstraklasa: 2008–09

PSV Eindhoven
KNVB Cup: 2011–12
Johan Cruyff Shield: 2012

Beşiktaş
Süper Lig: 2015–16, 2016–17
Lyon

 Coupe de la Ligue runner-up: 2019–20

Individual
Ekstraklasa Player of the Month: December 2009

References

External links
 
 

1987 births
Living people
People from São Vicente, São Paulo
Brazilian footballers
Brazil under-20 international footballers
Association football defenders
Santos FC players
Wisła Kraków players
PSV Eindhoven players
Hannover 96 players
Beşiktaş J.K. footballers
Olympique Lyonnais players
FC Girondins de Bordeaux players
Western Sydney Wanderers FC players
Campeonato Brasileiro Série A players
Ekstraklasa players
Eredivisie players
Bundesliga players
Süper Lig players
Ligue 1 players
Championnat National 2 players
Brazilian expatriate footballers
Brazilian expatriate sportspeople in Poland
Brazilian expatriate sportspeople in the Netherlands
Brazilian expatriate sportspeople in Germany
Brazilian expatriate sportspeople in Turkey
Brazilian expatriate sportspeople in France
Brazilian expatriate sportspeople in Australia
Expatriate footballers in Poland
Expatriate footballers in the Netherlands
Expatriate footballers in Germany
Expatriate footballers in Turkey
Expatriate footballers in France
Expatriate soccer players in Australia
Footballers from São Paulo (state)